Angélica Esperanza Dacunda was an Argentine politician. She was elected to the Chamber of Deputies in 1951 as one of the first group of female parliamentarians in Argentina.

Biography
In the 1951 legislative elections she was a Peronist Party candidate in Corrientes and was one of the 26 women elected to the Chamber of Deputies. She remained in office until 1955.

References

Women members of the Argentine Chamber of Deputies
Justicialist Party politicians
Members of the Argentine Chamber of Deputies elected in Corrientes
20th-century Argentine politicians
20th-century Argentine women politicians
Year of birth missing
Possibly living people